Deep Run is a tributary of Ellison Creek in Henderson County, Illinois in the United States. The GNIS I.D. number is 407054.

References

Rivers of Illinois